The 2022 National Invitation Tournament was a single-elimination tournament of 32 NCAA Division I men's college basketball teams not selected to participate in the 2022 NCAA tournament. The tournament began on March 15 and ended on March 31. The first three rounds were played on campuses, with the semi-final and championship final played at Madison Square Garden in New York City.

Participants
Teams and pairings for the 2022 NIT were released by the NIT Committee at 9 p.m. Eastern time Sunday, March 13, on ESPNU. It returned to its previous 32-team field for the first time since 2019. In 2021, Memphis won the NIT Title.

Automatic qualifiers
After the tournament's cancellation in 2020 and its reduction in 2021 because of the ongoing COVID-19 pandemic, the 2022 tournament returned to the NIT's standard format of guaranteeing berths to teams which had the best regular season record in their conference, but failed to win their conference tournament.

At-large bids
The following teams were awarded at-large bids.

Schedule 
The 2022 National Invitation Tournament began on Tuesday, March 15 with the first round. First round games were played both on Tuesday, and Wednesday, March 16. The semifinals were held on Tuesday, March 29, and the championship on Thursday, March 31.

Bracket
The 32-team bracket was announced on March 13. It was released via the NIT Selection Show on ESPNU at 9 p.m. EDT on March 13.

^  Dayton's first-round game played at Toledo due to UD Arena hosting First Four 2022 NCAA tournament games.
^  Dayton's second-round game played at Vanderbilt due to UD Arena hosting OHSAA Boys Basketball State Tournament games.

^ Game played at Virginia due to construction work at Humphrey Coliseum.

* Denotes overtime period

Media
ESPN, Inc. had exclusive television rights to all of the NIT games. It telecasted every game across ESPN, ESPN2, ESPNU, and ESPN+. Westwood One had exclusive radio rights to the semifinals and the championship.

See also
2022 Women's National Invitation Tournament

References

National Invitation
National Invitation Tournament
2020s in Manhattan
National Invitation Tournament
Basketball competitions in New York City
College sports tournaments in New York City
Madison Square Garden
National Invitation Tournament
Sports in Manhattan
College basketball tournaments in New York (state)